NGC 890 is a lenticular galaxy in the constellation Triangulum. It is estimated to be 180 million light-years from the Milky Way and has a diameter of approximately 130,000 ly. NGC 890 was discovered on September 13, 1784 by Wilhelm Herschel.

See also 
 List of NGC objects (1–1000)

References 

0890
Lenticular galaxies
Triangulum (constellation)
008997